Khlebodarovka is a rural locality (a village) in Yumaguzinsky Selsoviet, Kugarchinsky District, Bashkortostan, Russia. The population was 69 as of 2010. There is 1 street.

Geography 
Khlebodarovka is located 44 km northwest of Mrakovo (the district's administrative centre) by road. Alexandrovka is the nearest rural locality.

References 

Rural localities in Kugarchinsky District